Antônio Braga Neto (born October 29, 1987) is a Brazilian mixed martial artist and grappler. He competed in the Ultimate Fighting Championship. He is a gold medalist in both the World Jiu-Jitsu Championship and Pan American Championship.

Mixed martial arts career
A Brazilian Jiu-Jitsu Black Belt World Champion under Roberto "Gordo" Correa, Neto currently trains out of Evolve MMA in Brazil and Singapore.

Early career
Neto made his professional MMA debut in October 2006 in his native Brazil.  He was undefeated for the first five fights of his career, with only one fight going to a decision.

In 2008, Neto made his debut in Japan when he signed with the Sengoku promotion.  He faced Ryo Kawamura and lost by decision, the first loss of his professional career.

In 2009, Neto signed with the Chinese organization Art of War Fighting Championship. He made his debut against Dutch fighter Rodney Glunder; the fight was cut short when a takedown from Neto sent Glunder through the ring ropes onto the floor and some tools and electrical equipment.  Glunder suffered injuries to his back and was taken away from the ring on a stretcher by ringside physicians and doctors. Neto competed in the 2011 ADCC Submission Wrestling World Championship, losing to veteran grappler and current UFC fighter Sérgio Moraes in his ADCC debut.

Ultimate Fighting Championship
In April 2013, Neto signed a three fight deal with the Ultimate Fighting Championship. He made his UFC debut at UFC on Fuel TV: Nogueira vs. Werdum against former Strikeforce fighter Anthony Smith. He won the fight in quick fashion, finishing via a kneebar submission at 1:52 of the first round.

Neto was expected to face Derek Brunson on November 6, 2013 at UFC Fight Night 31. However, he pulled out of the bout citing an injury and was replaced by Brian Houston.

Neto faced Clint Hester on June 28, 2014 at UFC Fight Night 44. He lost the back and forth fight via split decision.

Neto was expected to face Zak Cummings on July 25, 2015 at UFC on Fox 16. However, he pulled out of the fight in early July and was replaced by promotional newcomer Dominique Steele.

After an extended hiatus, Neto faced Trevin Giles on December 9, 2017 at UFC Fight Night 123. He lost the fight via knockout in the third round.

Neto was scheduled to face Andrew Sanchez on August 25, 2018 at UFC Fight Night 135. However, he was removed from the bout on August 2 for undisclosed personal issues and replaced by Markus Perez.

Neto was scheduled to face Deron Winn on December 19, 2020 at UFC Fight Night 185. However, he was again removed from the contest due to undisclosed reasons and replaced by Antônio Arroyo.

Neto was scheduled to face Abdul Razak Alhassan on August 21, 2021 at UFC on ESPN 29. However, Neto was pulled from the event after testing positive for COVID-19. A few few days later, it was announced that Neto was released by the UFC.

Mixed martial arts record

|- 
| Loss
| align=center| 9–3 (1)
| Trevin Giles 
| KO (punches)
| UFC Fight Night: Swanson vs. Ortega 
| 
| align=center|3
| align=center|2:27
| Fresno, California, United States
|
|-
| Loss
| align=center| 9–2 (1)
| Clint Hester
| Decision (split)
| UFC Fight Night: Swanson vs. Stephens
| 
| align=center| 3
| align=center| 5:00
| San Antonio, Texas, United States
| 
|-
| Win
| align=center| 9–1 (1)
| Anthony Smith
| Submission (kneebar)
| UFC on Fuel TV: Nogueira vs. Werdum
| 
| align=center| 1
| align=center| 1:52
| Fortaleza, Brazil
| 
|-
| Win
| align=center| 8–1 (1)
| Brock Larson
| Submission (kneebar)
| MMA Against Dengue 2
| 
| align=center| 1
| align=center| 1:04
| Rio de Janeiro, Brazil
| 
|-
| Win
| align=center| 7–1 (1)
| Maiquel Falcão
| Submission (kimura)
| Amazon Forest Combat 1
| 
| align=center| 2
| align=center| 4:26
| Manaus, Brazil
|
|-
| Win
| align=center| 6–1 (1)
| Douglas Cristian
| Submission (verbal)
| Top Fighter MMA
| 
| align=center| 2
| align=center| N/A
| Rio de Janeiro, Brazil
| 
|-
| NC
| align=center| 5–1 (1)
| Rodney Glunder
| No Contest (fighters fell from the ring)
| Art of War 14
| 
| align=center| 1
| align=center| 0:24
| Macau, China
| 
|-
| Loss
| align=center| 5–1
| Ryo Kawamura
| Decision (unanimous)
| World Victory Road Presents: Sengoku First Battle
| 
| align=center| 3
| align=center| 5:00
| Tokyo, Japan
| 
|-
| Win
| align=center| 5–0
| Fabiano Astorino
| Submission (kimura)
| Fury FC 5: Final Conflict
| 
| align=center| 1
| align=center| 2:25
| São Paulo, Brazil
| 
|-
| Win
| align=center| 4–0
| Renato Matos	
| TKO (punches)
| Detonaco Fight Championship
| 
| align=center| 1
| align=center| 4:55
| Brazil
| 
|-
| Win
| align=center| 3–0
| Cezar Ferreira 
| Decision (unanimous)
| XFC: Brazil
| 
| align=center| 3
| align=center| 5:00
| Rio de Janeiro, Brazil
| 
|-
| Win
| align=center| 2–0
| Eduardo Camilo	
| Submission (armbar)
| XFC: Brazil
| 
| align=center| 1
| align=center| 1:46
| Rio de Janeiro, Brazil
| 
|-
| Win
| align=center| 1–0
| Lolito Lolito
| Submission (armbar)
| Top Fighter MMA 2
| 
| align=center| 1
| align=center| N/A
| Rio de Janeiro, Brazil
|

See also
 List of male mixed martial artists

References

External links
 
 

Living people
1987 births
Brazilian male mixed martial artists
Light heavyweight mixed martial artists
Mixed martial artists utilizing Brazilian jiu-jitsu
Brazilian practitioners of Brazilian jiu-jitsu
People awarded a black belt in Brazilian jiu-jitsu
Sportspeople from Espírito Santo
Brazilian expatriates in Singapore
Ultimate Fighting Championship male fighters
World No-Gi Brazilian Jiu-Jitsu Championship medalists